The Wych Elm cultivar Ulmus glabra 'Fastigiata Stricta' was listed by Bean in Kew Hand-List Trees & Shrubs ed. 3. 273. 1925, but without description. It is possibly synonymous with U. glabra 'Fastigiata'.

Description
Not available.

Cultivation
No specimens are known to survive.

References

Wych elm cultivar
Ulmus articles missing images
Ulmus
Missing elm cultivars